Muzlifah Haniffa is a Malaysian dermatologist and immunologist who focuses on the development of the immune system and the use of single-cell techniques to understand biology. Haniffa is a professor and Wellcome Trust Senior Research Fellow in the Faculty of Medical Sciences at Newcastle University.

Early life and education 
Haniffa was born in Penang, Malaysia. Her interests in science as a child were piqued initially by space, but later she decided to pursue a career as a clinical scientist. Haniffa studied at Tunku Kurshiah College, Seremban and moved to the UK in the 1990s. Haniffa graduated BSc, MBBCh from the University of Wales College of Medicine in 1999. She became a member of the Royal College of Physicians in 2002. In 2007, she earned a diploma in epidemiology from the London School of Hygiene & Tropical Medicine. She completed her PhD from Newcastle University in 2009 and completed her clinical dermatology training in 2010. She was runner-up for the 2009 Sue McCarthy Prize from the Medical Research Council.

Career 
In 2013 the European Society for Dermatology Research awarded Haniffa a Silver Award for her research. She was shortlisted for the 2016 North Eastern Woman Entrepreneur of the Year awards in the STEM category. In 2016 her research into the functions of white blood cells was boosted by a £200,000 fellowship by the Lister Institute of Preventive Medicine. Professor Chris Day, serving as vice-chancellor of the medical faculty, congratulated Haniffa on her achievement, saying:

Haniffa's work on the immune system has included discovering that a population of what was considered dendritic cells (defined by the presence of CD14) in human skin were in fact macrophages, and studies demonstrating that a subset of dendritic cells exist in mice which can activate T helper 17 cells against a fungal infection. Haniffa was awarded the 2018 Early Career Prize in Allerlology by the 5th European Congress on Immunology.

Haniffa is a member of the Human Cell Atlas, which aims to characterise all cells in the human body using single-cell transcriptomic techniques, alongside Sarah Teichmann, Fiona Powrie, Ashley Moffett, and others. In 2018 her lab contributed to the discovery of the major subset of kidney cells which become mutated and give rise to kidney cancers. This was accomplished by matching the biological make-up of kidney carcinoma cells to given healthy kidney cells. This was followed by a single-cell study of the placenta which discovered new cell sub-types in the decidua, informing understanding of how the maternal and fetal immune systems interact with each other and avoid miscarriage or pre-eclampsia. The study used 70,000 cells and tissue from the Human Developmental Biology Resource. In addition Haniffa and collaborators have published single-cell studies on the innate and adaptive immune system, including regulatory T cells, dendritic cells, and monocytes. In 2019 the Chan Zuckerberg Initiative announced that it was investing $68 million in grants into furthering the Human Cell Atlas, including awards for Haniffa to study the immune system and liver during ageing in single-cell detail.

She is a committee member of the British Society for Investigative Dermatology, who had awarded Haniffa a Junior Investigator Prize in 2012.

References

Living people
People from Penang
Malaysian dermatologists
Malaysian immunologists
Alumni of Newcastle University
Year of birth missing (living people)
Members of the Royal College of Physicians
Alumni of Cardiff University
Malaysian emigrants to the United Kingdom
21st-century women physicians